The Balkans, also known as the Balkan Peninsula, is a geographical area in southeastern Europe with various geographical and historical definitions. The region takes its name from the Balkan Mountains that stretch throughout the whole of Bulgaria. The Balkan Peninsula is bordered by the Adriatic Sea in the northwest, the Ionian Sea in the southwest, the Aegean Sea in the south, the Turkish straits in the east, and the Black Sea in the northeast. The northern border of the peninsula is variously defined. The highest point of the Balkans is Musala, in the Rila mountain range, Bulgaria.

The concept of the Balkan Peninsula was created by the German geographer August Zeune in 1808, who mistakenly considered the Balkan Mountains the dominant mountain system of Southeast Europe spanning from the Adriatic Sea to the Black Sea. The term Balkan Peninsula was a synonym for Rumelia in the 19th century, the European provinces of the Ottoman Empire. It had a geopolitical rather than a geographical definition, which was further promoted during the creation of the Kingdom of Yugoslavia in the early 20th century. The definition of the Balkan Peninsula's natural borders does not coincide with the technical definition of a peninsula; hence modern geographers reject the idea of a Balkan Peninsula, while historical scholars usually discuss the Balkans as a region. The term has acquired a stigmatized and pejorative meaning related to the process of Balkanization. The alternative term used for the region is Southeast Europe.

Name

Etymology
The origin of the word Balkan is obscure; it may be related to Turkish bālk 'mud' (from Proto-Turkic *bal 'mud, clay; thick or gluey substance', cf. also Turkic bal 'honey'), and the Turkish suffix an 'swampy forest' or Persian balā-khāna 'big high house'. It was used mainly during the time of the Ottoman Empire. In modern Turkish  means 'chain of wooded mountains'.

Historical names and meaning

Classical antiquity and the early Middle Ages
From classical antiquity through the Middle Ages, the Balkan Mountains were called by the local Thracian name Haemus. According to Greek mythology, the Thracian king Haemus was turned into a mountain by Zeus as a punishment and the mountain has remained with his name. A reverse name scheme has also been suggested. D. Dechev considers that Haemus (Αἷμος) is derived from a Thracian word *saimon, 'mountain ridge'. A third possibility is that "Haemus" derives from the Greek word "haima" meaning 'blood'. The myth relates to a fight between Zeus and the monster/titan Typhon. Zeus injured Typhon with a thunder bolt and Typhon's blood fell on the mountains, from which they got their name.

Late Middle Ages and Ottoman period
The earliest mention of the name appears in an early 14th-century Arab map, in which the Haemus Mountains are referred to as Balkan. The first attested time the name "Balkan" was used in the West for the mountain range in Bulgaria was in a letter sent in 1490 to Pope Innocent VIII by Buonaccorsi Callimaco, an Italian humanist, writer and diplomat. The Ottomans first mention it in a document dated from 1565. There has been no other documented usage of the word to refer to the region before that, although other Turkic tribes had already settled in or were passing through the region. There is also a claim about an earlier Bulgar Turkic origin of the word popular in Bulgaria, however it is only an unscholarly assertion. The word was used by the Ottomans in Rumelia in its general meaning of mountain, as in Kod̲j̲a-Balkan, Čatal-Balkan, and Ungurus-Balkani̊, but especially it was applied to the Haemus mountain. The name is still preserved in Central Asia with the Balkan Daglary (Balkan Mountains) and the Balkan Region of Turkmenistan. English traveler John Bacon Sawrey Morritt introduced this term into English literature at the end of the 18th century, and other authors started applying the name to the wider area between the Adriatic and the Black Sea. The concept of the "Balkans" was created by the German geographer August Zeune in 1808, who mistakenly considered it as the dominant central mountain system of Southeast Europe spanning from the Adriatic Sea to the Black Sea. During the 1820s, "Balkan became the preferred although not yet exclusive term alongside Haemus among British travelers... Among Russian travelers not so burdened by classical toponymy, Balkan was the preferred term". In European books printed until late 1800s it was also known as Illyrian Peninsula or Illyrische Halbinsel in German.

Evolution of meaning in 19th and 20th century
The term was not commonly used in geographical literature until the mid-19th century because already then scientists like Carl Ritter warned that only the part South of the Balkan Mountains can be considered as a peninsula and considered it to be renamed as "Greek peninsula". Other prominent geographers who didn't agree with Zeune were Hermann Wagner, Theobald Fischer, Marion Newbigin, Albrecht Penck, while Austrian diplomat Johann Georg von Hahn in 1869 for the same territory used the term Südostereuropäische Halbinsel ("Southeasterneuropean peninsula"). Another reason it was not commonly accepted as the definition of then European Turkey had a similar land extent. However, after the Congress of Berlin (1878) there was a political need for a new term and gradually "the Balkans" was revitalized, but in the maps, the northern border was in Serbia and Montenegro without Greece (it only depicted the Ottoman occupied parts of Europe), while Yugoslavian maps also included Croatia and Bosnia. The term Balkan Peninsula was a synonym for European Turkey, the political borders of former Ottoman Empire provinces.

The usage of the term changed in the very end of the 19th and beginning of the 20th century when was embraced by Serbian geographers, most prominently by Jovan Cvijić. It was done with political reasoning as affirmation for Serbian nationalism on the whole territory of the South Slavs, and also included anthropological and ethnological studies of the South Slavs through which were claimed various nationalistic and racialist theories. Through such policies and Yugoslavian maps the term was elevated to the modern status of a geographical region. The term acquired political nationalistic connotations far from its initial geographic meaning, arising from political changes from the late 19th century to the creation of post–World War I Yugoslavia (initially the Kingdom of Serbs, Croats and Slovenes in 1918). After the dissolution of Yugoslavia beginning in June 1991, the term "Balkans" acquired a negative political meaning, especially in Croatia and Slovenia, as well in worldwide casual usage for war conflicts and fragmentation of territory (see Balkanization).

Southeast Europe

In part due to the historical and political connotations of the term "Balkans", especially since the military conflicts of the 1990s in Yugoslavia in the western half of the region, the term "Southeast Europe" is becoming increasingly popular. A European Union initiative of 1999 is called the Stability Pact for Southeastern Europe.
The online newspaper Balkan Times renamed itself Southeast European Times in 2003.

Current
In other languages of the region, the region is known as:

 Slavic languages:
 Bosnian, Montenegrin and  / 
 Bosnian and 
 
 Romance languages:
  or 
  or 
  or 
 Other languages:
  and 
 , transliterated: 
  or Balkanlar

Definitions and boundaries

Balkan Peninsula

The Balkan Peninsula is bounded by the Adriatic Sea to the west, the Mediterranean Sea (including the Ionian and Aegean seas) and the Sea of Marmara to the south and the Black Sea to the east. Its northern boundary is often given as the Danube, Sava and Kupa Rivers. It is more or less identical to the region known as Southeast Europe.

From 1920 until World War II, Italy included Istria and some Dalmatian areas (like Zara, today's Zadar) that are within the general definition of the Balkan Peninsula. The current territory of Italy includes only the small area around Trieste inside the Balkan Peninsula. However, the regions of Trieste and Istria are not usually considered part of the Balkans by Italian geographers, due to their definition of the Balkans that limits its western border to the Kupa River.

Share of total area in brackets within the Balkan Peninsula by country, by the Danube–Sava definition, with Bulgaria and Greece occupying almost the half of the territory of the Balkan Peninsula, with around 23% of the total area each.

Countries wholly within the Balkan Peninsula:

 : 28,749 km2 (100% of total land)
 : 51,180 km2 (100%)
 : 110,993.6 km2 (100%); according to another sources -  or 110,372 km2 (100%)
 : 10,908 km2 (100%)
 : 13,810 km2 (100%)
 : 25,713 km2 (100%)

Countries mostly within the Balkan Peninsula:

  (mainland): 110,496 km2 (83.7%); according to another source, 106,247 km2 (80.5%); including islands adjacent to the Balkan Peninsula, 126,023 km2 (95.5%)
  (Central Serbia) 55,968 km2 (63.2%); excluding Kosovo (72.2%)

Countries partially within the Balkan Peninsula:

  (southern mainland): 24,013 km2 (42.4%)
  (south-western part): 5,000 km2 (24.7%)

Countries mostly outside the Balkan Peninsula:

  (Northern Dobruja): 11,000 km2 (4.6%)
  (East Thrace): 23,764 km2 (3%)
  (Gorizia and Trieste): 678 km2 (0.2%)

Balkans
The term "the Balkans" is used more generally for the region; it includes states in the region, which may extend beyond the peninsula, and is not defined by the geography of the peninsula itself.

Historians state the Balkans comprise Albania, Bosnia and Herzegovina, Bulgaria, Croatia, Greece, Kosovo, Montenegro, North Macedonia, Romania, Serbia, and Slovenia. Italy, although having a small part of its territory on the Balkan Peninsula, is not included in the term "the Balkans".

The term Southeast Europe is also used for the region, with various definitions. Individual Balkan states can also be considered part of other regions, including Southern Europe, Eastern Europe, and Central Europe. Turkey, including its European territory, is generally included in Western Asia or the Middle East.

Note:  The area figure provided by the Encyclopædia Britannica includes Romania but excludes Greece. If Greece is included, the total area of the Balkans would be 790,011 km2.

Western Balkans

The Western Balkans is a political neologism coined to refer to Albania and the territory of the former Yugoslavia, except Slovenia, since the early 1990s. The region of the Western Balkans, a coinage exclusively used in Pan-European parlance, roughly corresponds to the Dinaric Alps territory.

The institutions of the European Union have generally used the term Western Balkans to mean the Balkan area that includes countries that are not members of the European Union, while others refer to the geographical aspects.
Each of these countries aims to be part of the future enlargement of the European Union and reach democracy and transmission scores but, until then, they will be strongly connected with the pre-EU waiting program Central European Free Trade Agreement. Croatia, considered part of the Western Balkans, joined the EU in July 2013.

Criticism of the geographical definition
The term is criticized for having a geopolitical, rather than a geographical meaning and definition, as a multiethnic and political area in the southeastern part of Europe. The geographical term of a peninsula defines that the water border must be longer than land, with the land side being the shortest in the triangle, but that is not the case with the Balkan Peninsula. Both Eastern and Western water cathetus from Odesa to Cape Matapan (–1350 km) and from Trieste to Cape Matapan (–1285 km) are shorter than land cathetus from Trieste to Odessa (–1365 km). The land has a too wide line connected to the continent to be technically proclaimed as a peninsula - Szczecin (920 km) and Rostock (950 km) at the Baltic Sea are closer to Trieste than Odessa yet it is not considered as another European peninsula. Since the late 19th and early 20th-century literature is not known where is exactly the northern border between the peninsula and the continent, with an issue, whether the rivers are suitable for its definition. In the studies the Balkans' natural borders, especially the northern border, are often avoided to be addressed, considered as a "fastidious problem" by André Blanc in Geography of the Balkans (1965), while John Lampe and Marvin Jackman in Balkan Economic History (1971) noted that "modern geographers seem agreed in rejecting the old idea of a Balkan Peninsula". Another issue is the name because the Balkan Mountains which are mostly located in Northern Bulgaria are not dominating the region by length and area like the Dinaric Alps. An eventual Balkan peninsula can be considered a territory South of the Balkan Mountains, with a possible name "Greek-Albanian Peninsula." The term influenced the meaning of Southeast Europe which again is not properly defined by geographical factors yet historical borders of the Balkans.

Croatian geographers and academics are highly critical of inclusion of Croatia within the broad geographical, social-political and historical context of the Balkans, while the neologism Western Balkans is perceived as a humiliation of Croatia by the European political powers. According to M. S. Altić, the term has two different meanings, "geographical, ultimately undefined, and cultural, extremely negative, and recently strongly motivated by the contemporary political context". In 2018, President of Croatia Kolinda Grabar-Kitarović stated that the use of the term "Western Balkans" should be avoided because it does not imply only a geographic area, but also negative connotations, and instead must be perceived as and called Southeast Europe because it is part of Europe.

Slovenian philosopher Slavoj Žižek said of the definition,

Nature and natural resources

Most of the area is covered by mountain ranges running from the northwest to southeast. The main ranges are the Balkan Mountains (Stara Planina in Bulgarian language), running from the Black Sea coast in Bulgaria to the border with Serbia, the Rila-Rhodope massif in southern Bulgaria, the Dinaric Alps in Bosnia and Herzegovina, Croatia and Montenegro, the Korab-Šar mountains which spreads from Kosovo to Albania and North Macedonia, and the Pindus range, spanning from southern Albania into central Greece and the Albanian Alps, and the Alps at the northwestern border. The highest mountain of the region is Rila in Bulgaria, with Musala at 2,925 m, second being Mount Olympus in Greece, with Mytikas at 2,917 m, and Pirin mountain with Vihren, also in Bulgaria, being the third at 2915 m. The karst field or polje is a common feature of the landscape.

On the Adriatic and Aegean coasts the climate is Mediterranean, on the Black Sea coast the climate is humid subtropical and oceanic, and inland it is humid continental. In the northern part of the peninsula and on the mountains, winters are frosty and snowy, while summers are hot and dry. In the southern part, winters are milder. The humid continental climate is predominant in Bosnia and Herzegovina, northern Croatia, Bulgaria, Kosovo, northern Montenegro, the Republic of North Macedonia, and the interior of Albania and Serbia. Meanwhile, the other less common climates, the humid subtropical and oceanic climates, are seen on the Black Sea coast of Bulgaria and Balkan Turkey (European Turkey). The Mediterranean climate is seen on the Adriatic coasts of Albania, Croatia and Montenegro, as well as the Ionian coasts of Albania and Greece, in addition to the Aegean coasts of Greece and Balkan Turkey (European Turkey).

Over the centuries forests have been cut down and replaced with bush. In the southern part and on the coast there is evergreen vegetation. Inland there are woods typical of Central Europe (oak and beech, and in the mountains, spruce, fir and pine). The tree line in the mountains lies at the height of 1800–2300 m. The land provides habitats for numerous endemic species, including extraordinarily abundant insects and reptiles that serve as food for a variety of birds of prey and rare vultures.

The soils are generally poor, except on the plains, where areas with natural grass, fertile soils and warm summers provide an opportunity for tillage. Elsewhere, land cultivation is mostly unsuccessful because of the mountains, hot summers and poor soils, although certain cultures such as olive and grape flourish.

Resources of energy are scarce, except in Kosovo, where considerable coal, lead, zinc, chromium and silver deposits are located. Other deposits of coal, especially in Bulgaria, Serbia and Bosnia, also exist. Lignite deposits are widespread in Greece. Petroleum scarce reserves exist in Greece, Serbia and Albania. Natural gas deposits are scarce. Hydropower is in wide use, from over 1,000 dams. The often relentless bora wind is also being harnessed for power generation.

Metal ores are more usual than other raw materials. Iron ore is rare, but in some countries there is a considerable amount of copper, zinc, tin, chromite, manganese, magnesite and bauxite. Some metals are exported.

History and geopolitical significance

Antiquity

The Balkan region was the first area in Europe to experience the arrival of farming cultures in the Neolithic era. The Balkans have been inhabited since the Paleolithic and are the route by which farming from the Middle East spread to Europe during the Neolithic (7th millennium BC). The practices of growing grain and raising livestock arrived in the Balkans from the Fertile Crescent by way of Anatolia and spread west and north into Central Europe, particularly through Pannonia. Two early culture-complexes have developed in the region, Starčevo culture and Vinča culture. The Balkans are also the location of the first advanced civilizations. Vinča culture developed a form of proto-writing before the Sumerians and Minoans, known as the Old European script, while the bulk of the symbols had been created in the period between 4500 and 4000 BC, with the ones on the Tărtăria clay tablets even dating back to around 5300 BC.

The identity of the Balkans is dominated by its geographical position; historically the area was known as a crossroads of cultures. It has been a juncture between the Latin and Greek bodies of the Roman Empire, the destination of a massive influx of pagan Bulgars and Slavs, an area where Orthodox and Catholic Christianity met, as well as the meeting point between Islam and Christianity.

In pre-classical and classical antiquity, this region was home to Greeks, Illyrians, Paeonians, Thracians, Dacians, and other ancient groups. The Achaemenid Persian Empire incorporated parts of the Balkans comprising Macedonia, Thrace, parts of present-day Bulgaria, and the Black Sea coastal region of Romania between the late sixth and the first half of the fifth-century BC into its territories. Later the Roman Empire conquered the region and spread Roman culture and the Latin language, but significant parts still remained under classical Greek influence. The Romans considered the Rhodope Mountains to be the northern limit of the Peninsula of Haemus and the same limit applied approximately to the border between Greek and Latin use in the region (later called the Jireček Line). However large spaces south of Jireček Line were and are inhabited by Vlachs (Aromanians), the Romance-speaking heirs of Roman Empire. The Bulgars and Slavs arrived in the sixth-century and began assimilating and displacing already-assimilated (through Romanization and Hellenization) older inhabitants of the northern and central Balkans, forming the Bulgarian Empire. During the Middle Ages, the Balkans became the stage for a series of wars between the Byzantine Roman and the Bulgarian Empires. Prior to the Slavic landing, parts of the western peninsula have been home to the Proto-Albanians. Including cities like Nish, Shtip, Skopje and others. This can be proven through the development of the names, for example Naissos > Nish, Astibos > Shtip (compare lat. amicus > alb. mik), Scupi > Shkup all follow Albanian phonetic sound rules and have entered Slavic, demonstrating that Proto-Albanian was spoken prior to the Slavic invasion of the Balkans.

Early modern period
By the end of the 16th century, the Ottoman Empire had become the controlling force in the region after expanding from Anatolia through Thrace to the Balkans. Many people in the Balkans place their greatest folk heroes in the era of either the onslaught or the retreat of the Ottoman Empire. As examples, for Greeks, Constantine XI Palaiologos and Kolokotronis; and for Serbs, Miloš Obilić, Tsar Lazar and Karadjordje; for Albanians, George Kastrioti Skanderbeg; for ethnic Macedonians, Nikola Karev and Goce Delčev; for Bulgarians, Vasil Levski, Georgi Sava Rakovski and Hristo Botev and for Croats, Nikola Šubić Zrinjski.

In the past several centuries, because of the frequent Ottoman wars in Europe fought in and around the Balkans and the comparative Ottoman isolation from the mainstream of economic advance (reflecting the shift of Europe's commercial and political centre of gravity towards the Atlantic), the Balkans have been the least developed part of Europe. According to Halil İnalcık, "The population of the Balkans, according to one estimate, fell from a high of 8 million in the late 16th-century to only 3 million by the mid-eighteenth. This estimate is based on Ottoman documentary evidence."

Most of the Balkan nation-states emerged during the 19th and early 20th centuries as they gained independence from the Ottoman Empire or the Austro-Hungarian empire: Greece in 1821, Serbia, and Montenegro in 1878, Romania in 1881, Bulgaria in 1908 and Albania in 1912.

Recent history

World Wars
In 1912–1913 the First Balkan War broke out when the nation-states of Bulgaria, Serbia, Greece and Montenegro united in an alliance against the Ottoman Empire. As a result of the war, almost all remaining European territories of the Ottoman Empire were captured and partitioned among the allies. Ensuing events also led to the creation of an independent Albanian state. Bulgaria insisted on its status quo territorial integrity, divided and shared by the Great Powers next to the Russo-Turkish War (1877–78) in other boundaries and on the pre-war Bulgarian-Serbian agreement. Bulgaria was provoked by the backstage deals between its former allies, Serbia and Greece, on the allocation of the spoils at the end of the First Balkan War. At the time, Bulgaria was fighting at the main Thracian Front. Bulgaria marks the beginning of Second Balkan War when it attacked them. The Serbs and the Greeks repulsed single attacks, but when the Greek army invaded Bulgaria together with an unprovoked Romanian intervention in the back, Bulgaria collapsed. The Ottoman Empire used the opportunity to recapture Eastern Thrace, establishing its new western borders that still stand today as part of modern Turkey.

The World War I was sparked in the Balkans in 1914 when members of Young Bosnia, a revolutionary organization with predominantly Serb and pro-Yugoslav members, assassinated the Austro-Hungarian heir Archduke Franz Ferdinand of Austria in Bosnia and Herzegovina's capital, Sarajevo. That caused a war between Austria-Hungary and Serbia, which—through the existing chains of alliances—led to the World War I. The Ottoman Empire soon joined the Central Powers becoming one of the three empires participating in that alliance. The next year Bulgaria joined the Central Powers attacking Serbia, which was successfully fighting Austro-Hungary to the north for a year. That led to Serbia's defeat and the intervention of the Entente in the Balkans which sent an expeditionary force to establish a new front, the third one of that war, which soon also became static. The participation of Greece in the war three years later, in 1918, on the part of the Entente finally altered the balance between the opponents leading to the collapse of the common German-Bulgarian front there, which caused the exit of Bulgaria from the war, and in turn, the collapse of the Austro-Hungarian Empire, ending the First World War.

Between the two wars, in order to maintain the geopolitical status quo in the region after the end of World War I, the Balkan Pact, or Balkan Entente, was formed by a treaty between Greece, Romania, Turkey and Yugoslavia on 9 February 1934 in Athens.

With the start of the World War II, all Balkan countries, with the exception of Greece, were allies of Nazi Germany, having bilateral military agreements or being part of the Axis Pact. Fascist Italy expanded the war in the Balkans by using its protectorate Albania to invade Greece. After repelling the attack, the Greeks counterattacked, invading Italy-held Albania and causing Nazi Germany's intervention in the Balkans to help its ally. Days before the German invasion, a successful coup d'état in Belgrade by neutral military personnel seized power.

Although the new government reaffirmed its intentions to fulfill its obligations as a member of the Axis, Germany, with Bulgaria, invaded both Greece and Yugoslavia. Yugoslavia immediately disintegrated when those loyal to the Serbian King and the Croatian units mutinied. Greece resisted, but, after two months of fighting, collapsed and was occupied. The two countries were partitioned between the three Axis allies, Bulgaria, Germany and Italy, and the Independent State of Croatia, a puppet state of Italy and Germany.

During the occupation, the population suffered considerable hardship due to repression and starvation, to which the population reacted by creating a mass resistance movement. Together with the early and extremely heavy winter of that year (which caused hundreds of thousands of deaths among the poorly fed population), the German invasion had disastrous effects in the timetable of the planned invasion in Russia causing a significant delay, which had major consequences during the course of the war.

Finally, at the end of 1944, the Soviets entered Romania and Bulgaria forcing the Germans out of the Balkans. They left behind a region largely ruined as a result of wartime exploitation.

Cold War
During the Cold War, most of the countries on the Balkans were governed by communist governments. Greece became the first battleground of the emerging Cold War. The Truman Doctrine was the US response to the civil war, which raged from 1944 to 1949. This civil war, unleashed by the Communist Party of Greece, backed by communist volunteers from neighboring countries (Albania, Bulgaria and Yugoslavia), led to massive American assistance for the non-communist Greek government. With this backing, Greece managed to defeat the partisans and, ultimately, remained one of the two only non-communist countries in the region with Turkey.

However, despite being under communist governments, Yugoslavia (1948) and Albania (1961) fell out with the Soviet Union. Yugoslavia, led by Marshal Josip Broz Tito (1892–1980), first propped up then rejected the idea of merging with Bulgaria and instead sought closer relations with the West, later even spearheaded, together with India and Egypt the Non-Aligned Movement. Albania on the other hand gravitated toward Communist China, later adopting an isolationist position.

On 28 February 1953, Greece, Turkey and Yugoslavia signed the treaty of Agreement of Friendship and Cooperation in Ankara to form the Balkan Pact of 1953. The treaty's aim was to deter Soviet expansion in the Balkans and eventual creation of a joint military staff for the three countries. When the pact was signed, Turkey and Greece were members of the North Atlantic Treaty Organization (NATO), while Yugoslavia was a non-aligned communist state. With the Pact, Yugoslavia was able to indirectly associate itself with NATO. Though, it was planned for the pact to remain in force for 20 years, it dissolved in 1960.

As the only non-communist countries, Greece and Turkey were (and still are) part of NATO composing the southeastern wing of the alliance.

Post–Cold War
In the 1990s, the transition of the regions' ex-Eastern bloc countries towards democratic free-market societies went peacefully. While in the non-aligned Yugoslavia, Wars between the former Yugoslav republics broke out after Slovenia and Croatia held free elections and their people voted for independence on their respective countries' referendums. Serbia, in turn, declared the dissolution of the union as unconstitutional and the Yugoslav People's Army unsuccessfully tried to maintain the status quo. Slovenia and Croatia declared independence on 25 June 1991, which prompted the Croatian War of Independence in Croatia and the Ten-Day War in Slovenia. The Yugoslav forces eventually withdrew from Slovenia in 1991 while the war in Croatia continued until late 1995. The two were followed by Macedonia and later Bosnia and Herzegovina, with Bosnia being the most affected by the fighting. The wars prompted the United Nations' intervention and NATO ground and air forces took action against Serb forces in Bosnia and Herzegovina and FR Yugoslavia (i.e. Serbia and Montenegro).

From the dissolution of Yugoslavia six stated achieved internationally recognized sovereignty: Slovenia, Croatia, Bosnia and Herzegovina, North Macedonia, Montenegro and Serbia; all of them are traditionally included in the Balkans which is often a controversial matter of dispute. In 2008, while under UN administration, Kosovo declared independence (according to the official Serbian policy, Kosovo is still an internal autonomous region). In July 2010, the International Court of Justice, ruled that the declaration of independence was legal. Most UN member states recognise Kosovo. After the end of the wars a revolution broke in Serbia and Slobodan Milošević, the Serbian communist leader (elected president between 1989 and 2000), was overthrown and handed for a trial to the International Criminal Tribunal for crimes against the International Humanitarian Law during the Yugoslav wars. Milošević died of a heart attack in 2006 before a verdict could have been released. Ιn 2001 an Albanian uprising in Macedonia (North Macedonia) forced the country to give local autonomy to the ethnic Albanians in the areas where they predominate.

With the dissolution of Yugoslavia, an issue emerged over the name under which the former (federated) republic of Macedonia would internationally be recognized, between the new country and Greece. Being the Macedonian part of Yugoslavia (see Vardar Macedonia), the federated republic under the Yugoslav identity had the name (Socialist) Republic of Macedonia on which it declared its sovereignty in 1991. Greece, having a large homonymous region (see Macedonia), opposed the usage of the name as an indication of a nationality and ethnicity. Thus dubbed Macedonia naming dispute was resolved under UN mediation in the June 2018 Prespa agreement was reached, which saw the country's renaming into North Macedonia in 2019.

Balkan countries control the direct land routes between Western Europe and South-West Asia (Asia Minor and the Middle East). Since 2000, all Balkan countries are friendly towards the EU and the US.

Greece has been a member of the European Union since 1981, while Slovenia is a member since 2004, Bulgaria and Romania are members since 2007, and Croatia is a member since 2013. In 2005, the European Union decided to start accession negotiations with candidate countries; Turkey, and North Macedonia were accepted as candidates for EU membership. In 2012, Montenegro started accession negotiations with the EU. In 2014, Albania is an official candidate for accession to the EU. In 2015, Serbia was expected to start accession negotiations with the EU, however this process has been stalled over the recognition of Kosovo as an independent state by existing EU member states.

Greece and Turkey have been NATO members since 1952. In March 2004, Bulgaria, Romania and Slovenia have become members of NATO. As of April 2009, Albania and Croatia are members of NATO. Montenegro joined in June 2017. The most recent member state to be added to NATO was North Macedonia on 27 March 2020.

Almost all other countries have expressed a desire to join the EU, NATO, or both at some point in the future.

Politics and economy

Currently, all of the states are republics, but until World War II all countries were monarchies. Most of the republics are parliamentary, excluding Romania and Bosnia which are semi-presidential. All the states have open market economies, most of which are in the upper-middle-income range ($4,000–12,000 p.c.), except Croatia, Romania, Greece, and Slovenia that have high income economies (over $12,000 p.c.), and are classified with very high HDI, along with Bulgaria, in contrast to the remaining states, which are classified with high HDI. The states from the former Eastern Bloc that formerly had planned economy system and Turkey mark gradual economic growth each year. The gross domestic product per capita is highest in Slovenia (over $29,000), followed by Greece (~$20,000), Croatia, Romania, Bulgaria (over $11,000), Turkey, Montenegro, Serbia (between $10,000 and $9,000), and Bosnia and Herzegovina, Albania, North Macedonia (~$7,000) and Kosovo ($5,000). The Gini coefficient, which indicates the level of difference by monetary welfare of the layers, is on the second level at the highest monetary equality in Albania, Bulgaria, and Serbia, on the third level in Greece, Montenegro and Romania, on the fourth level in North Macedonia, on the fifth level in Turkey, and the most unequal by Gini coefficient is Bosnia at the eighth level which is the penultimate level and one of the highest in the world. The unemployment is lowest in Romania and Bulgaria (around 5%), followed by Serbia and Albania (11–12%), Turkey, Greece, Bosnia, North Macedonia (13–16%), Montenegro (~18%), and Kosovo (~25%).
 On political, social and economic criteria the divisions are as follows:
 Territories members of the European Union: Bulgaria, Croatia, Greece, Romania, Slovenia
 Territories currently in negotiation process for EU membership: Albania, North Macedonia, Montenegro, Serbia, Turkey
 Territories with "potential candidates" status for EU membership: Bosnia and Herzegovina, Kosovo
 On border control and trade criteria the divisions are as follows:
 Territories in the Schengen Area: Croatia, Greece, Slovenia
 Territories that are legally bound to join the Schengen Area: Bulgaria, Romania
 Territories in a customs union with the EU: Turkey
 Territories members of the Central European Free Trade Agreement: Albania, Bosnia and Herzegovina, Kosovo, Montenegro, North Macedonia, Serbia.
 On currency criteria, the divisions are as follows:
 Territories members of the Eurozone: Croatia, Greece, Slovenia
 Territories using the Euro without authorization by the EU: Kosovo, Montenegro
 Territories using national currencies and are candidates for the Eurozone: Bulgaria (lev), Romania (leu)
 Territories using national currencies: Albania (lek), Bosnia and Herzegovina (convertible mark), North Macedonia (denar), Serbia (dinar), Turkey (lira).
 On military criteria the divisions are as follows:
 Member territories of NATO: Albania, Bulgaria, Croatia, Greece, Montenegro, North Macedonia, Romania, Slovenia, Turkey
 Member territories of the Partnership for Peace with Individual Partnership Action Plan and Membership Action Plan for joining NATO: Bosnia and Herzegovina
 Member territories of the Partnership for Peace: Serbia
 On the recent political, social and economic criteria there are two groups of countries:
 Former communist territories: Albania, Bosnia and Herzegovina, Bulgaria, Croatia, Kosovo, Montenegro, North Macedonia, Romania, Serbia, Slovenia
 Capitalist and aligned to the West during the Cold War: Greece, Turkey
 During the Cold War the Balkans were disputed between the two blocks. Greece and Turkey were members of NATO, Bulgaria and Romania of the Warsaw Pact, while Yugoslavia was a proponent of a third way and was a founding member of the Non-Aligned Movement. After the dissolution of Yugoslavia, Serbia and Bosnia and Herzegovina kept an observer status within the organization.

Regional organizations

See also the Black Sea regional organizations

Statistics

Demographics
The region is inhabited by Albanians, Aromanians, Bulgarians, Bosniaks, Croats, Gorani, Greeks, Istro-Romanians, Macedonians, Megleno-Romanians, Montenegrins, Serbs, Slovenes, Romanians, Turks, and other ethnic groups which present minorities in certain countries like the Romani and Ashkali.

Religion

The region is a meeting point of Orthodox Christianity, Islam and Roman Catholic Christianity. Eastern Orthodoxy is the majority religion in both the Balkan Peninsula and the Balkan region, The Eastern Orthodox Church has played a prominent role in the history and culture of Eastern and Southeastern Europe. A variety of different traditions of each faith are practiced, with each of the Eastern Orthodox countries having its own national church. A part of the population in the Balkans defines itself as irreligious.

Islam has a significant history in the region where Muslims make up a large percentage of the population. A 2013 estimate placed the total Muslim population of the Balkans at around 8 million. Islam is the largest religion in nations like Albania, Bosnia-Herzegovina, and Kosovo with significant minorities in Bulgaria, North Macedonia and Montenegro. Smaller populations of Muslims are also found in Romania, Serbia and Greece.

The Jewish communities of the Balkans were some of the oldest in Europe and date back to ancient times. These communities were Sephardi Jews, except in Croatia and Slovenia, where the Jewish communities were mainly Ashkenazi Jews. In Bosnia and Herzegovina, the small and close-knit Jewish community is 90% Sephardic, and Ladino is still spoken among the elderly. The Sephardi Jewish cemetery in Sarajevo has tombstones of a unique shape and inscribed in ancient Ladino. Sephardi Jews used to have a large presence in the city of Thessaloniki, and by 1900, some 80,000, or more than half of the population, were Jews. The Jewish communities in the Balkans suffered immensely during World War II, and the vast majority were killed during the Holocaust. An exception was the Bulgarian Jews, most of whom were saved by Boris III of Bulgaria, who resisted Adolf Hitler, opposing their deportation to Nazi concentration camps. Almost all of the few survivors have emigrated to the (then) newly founded state of Israel and elsewhere. Almost no Balkan country today has a significant Jewish minority.

Languages

The Balkan region today is a very diverse ethnolinguistic region, being home to multiple Slavic and Romance languages, as well as Albanian, Greek, Turkish, Hungarian and others. Romani is spoken by a large portion of the Romanis living throughout the Balkan countries. Throughout history, many other ethnic groups with their own languages lived in the area, among them Thracians, Illyrians, Romans, Celts and various Germanic tribes. All of the aforementioned languages from the present and from the past belong to the wider Indo-European language family, with the exception of the Turkic languages (e.g., Turkish and Gagauz) and Hungarian.

Urbanization
Most of the states in the Balkans are predominantly urbanized, with the lowest number of urban population as % of the total population found in Kosovo at under 40%, Bosnia and Herzegovina at 40% and Slovenia at 50%.

A list of largest cities:

 Only the European part of Istanbul is a part of the Balkans. It is home to two-thirds of the city's 15,519,267 inhabitants.

Time zones
The time zones in the Balkans are defined as the following:
 Territories in the time zone of UTC+01:00: Albania, Bosnia and Herzegovina, Croatia, Kosovo, Montenegro, North Macedonia, Serbia and Slovenia
 Territories in the time zone of UTC+02:00: Bulgaria, Greece, and Romania
 Territories in the time zone of UTC+03:00: Turkey

Culture
 Cuisine of the Balkans
 Balkan music
Balkan Athletics Championships
Balkan Athletics Indoor Championships
Imagining the Balkans

Historiography

See also

 Balkan Insight
 Balkan Universities Network
 Balkanization
 History of the Balkans
 Balkan Wars
 Yugoslav Wars
 Languages of the Balkans
 Balkan sprachbund
 Balkan music

Notes

References

Further reading
 
 
 
 
 Carter, Francis W., ed. (1977). An Historical Geography of the Balkans Academic Press. 
 Dvornik, Francis (1962). The Slavs in European History and Civilization Rutgers University Press. 
 Fine, John V. A., Jr. The Early Medieval Balkans: A Critical Survey from the Sixth to the Late Twelfth Century [1983]; The Late Medieval Balkans: A Critical Survey from the Late Twelfth Century to the Ottoman Conquest. Ann Arbor: University of Michigan Press, [1987]. 
 Forbes, Nevill (1915). The Balkans: A History of Bulgaria, Serbia, Greece, Rumania, Turkey  Clarendon Press, online
 
 
 
 
 Lampe, John R., and Marvin R. Jackson (1982). Balkan Economic History, 1550–1950: From Imperial Borderlands to Developing Nations Indiana University Press. 
 Király, Béla K., ed. (1984). East Central European Society in the Era of Revolutions, 1775–1856.  
 
 
 
  online free to borrow
 
 
 Zametica, John (2017). Folly and malice: the Habsburg empire, the Balkans and the start of World War One London: Shepheard–Walwyn. 416 pp. .

External links

 Balkan Insight – Analysis from Balkans
 Balkanalysis, in-depth research on Balkan geopolitics
 Western Balkans Photo impression
 Shared Pasts in Central and Southeast Europe, 17th–21st Centuries. Eds. G. Demeter, P. Peykovska. 2015.

 
Geography of Southeastern Europe
Peninsulas of Europe
Regions of Europe
Southeastern Europe
Turkish toponyms